Bornholms Erhvervsskole is an institution with secondary education on Bornholm, Denmark, responsible for providing education in many areas. It was founded on 1 July 1976. It merged with VUC Bornholm and Bornholm High School (one of Bornholm's two high schools) June 2010 to form a collaboration called Campus Bornholm.

External links
 Bornholms Erhvervsskole

Schools in Denmark
Educational institutions established in 1976
1976 establishments in Denmark